Crescent Valley High School, also known as CV, is a four-year public secondary school in Corvallis, Oregon, United States. Opened in 1971 in a rural location north of the city, it is one of the two traditional high schools of the Corvallis School District.

Academics

Courses are sometimes shared with Corvallis High School.

In 2008, 79% of the school's seniors received their high school diploma. Of 243 students, 192 graduated, 39 dropped out, 1 received a modified diploma, and 11 are still in high school.

In 2010, a student at the school was honored as a Presidential Scholar, one of three from Oregon. There have been two other Presidential Scholars from this school in the past ten years.

Reputation and ratings
According to the 2006-2007 School Report Card, the average SAT score of CV students is higher than both the Oregon state SAT average and the national SAT average (with 66% participation). In 2007, the school met AYP targets set by the No Child Left Behind Act for the first time since the act's legislation. The school has won the Oregonian Cup, which recognizes "overall excellence by schools in academics, activities and athletics," in the 2000-2001, 2006-2007, and 2007-2008 academic years.

The school received a silver ranking from U.S. News & World Report's 2010 "America's Best High Schools" survey.

Athletics

State championships
 Boys Soccer 1996, 1978
 Boys Tennis Team: 2013, 2014
 Girls Swim Team: 2007, 2008, 2009, 2010 2019
 Girls Cross Country: 1987
 Girls Basketball: 1978, 2022
 Chess: 1981, 2012 (Co-champions with Clackamas, Willamette, and La Salle), 2013, 2014
 Wrestling: 2019
 Girls Soccer: 2018, 2019

Activities

Band
 State champions: 2009

Orchestra
The Corvallis Camerata is a combination of both Corvallis high schools.
 State champions: 2009, 2012, 2013, 2015, 2016
 Mt. Hood Symphony festival winners: 1989, 1993, 1996, 1997, 1998, 2002, 2011

Choir
 State champions: 2009

Robotics
The CV Robotics team is a FIRST Robotics Competition team founded in 2002. Their team number is 955.
 PNW Regional Winner: 2013, 2015
 FIRST Championship Qualification: 2002, 2003, 2004, 2013, 2014, 2015, 2016
 Industrial Design Award: 2013, 2014

Chess
 National champions: 1979
State champions 1981

Crescent Crier newspaper
 Gold Crown, Columbia Scholastic Press Association, 1981

Alumni
 Meghna Chakrabarti (1993)  National Journalist, Public Radio host (On Point, Here & Now), Podcast host (Modern Love) 
 Steve LaVietes (1992), Oscar winner—Best Technical Achievement 2012
 Chris Botti (1981), Trumpet player
Robert Garrigus, golfer 
 Dave Johnson (1981), Olympic decathlete
 David Krane (1990), CEO of GV
Talanoa Hufanga - NFL Football Player, PAC-12 Defensive Player of the Year, San Francisco 49ers Safety

Faculty 

 Doug Riesenberg, NFL player

See also
 List of high schools in Oregon

References

External links

Buildings and structures in Corvallis, Oregon
Educational institutions established in 1971
High schools in Benton County, Oregon
Public high schools in Oregon
1971 establishments in Oregon
Education in Corvallis, Oregon